Horestaneh-ye Olya (also Romanized as Horestāneh-ye ‘Olyā and Harestaneh Olya; also known as Horestāneh Bālā, Horestāneh-ye Bālā, Horistāneh, and Howrestāneh-ye Bālā) is a village in Kenarrudkhaneh Rural District, in the Central District of Golpayegan County, Isfahan Province, Iran. At the 2006 census, its population was 81, in 23 families.

References 

Populated places in Golpayegan County